Madison Township is one of the seventeen townships of Hancock County, Ohio, United States. As of the 2010 census, the population was 844, down from 2,156 at the 2000 census.

Geography
Located in the southern part of the county, it borders the following townships:
Jackson Township - northeast
Delaware Township - east
Blanchard Township, Hardin County - southeast
Washington Township, Hardin County - southwest
Van Buren Township - west
Eagle Township - northwest

The village of Arlington is located in northern Madison Township, and the unincorporated community of Williamstown lies in the southern part of the township.

Name and history
It is one of twenty Madison Townships statewide.

Madison Township was organized in 1840. It was named for James Madison, fourth President of the United States.

Government
The township is governed by a three-member board of trustees, who are elected in November of odd-numbered years to a four-year term beginning on the following January 1. Two are elected in the year after the presidential election and one is elected in the year before it. There is also an elected township fiscal officer, who serves a four-year term beginning on April 1 of the year after the election, which is held in November of the year before the presidential election. Vacancies in the fiscal officership or on the board of trustees are filled by the remaining trustees.

References

External links

Townships in Hancock County, Ohio
Townships in Ohio